Skagen Funds is a Scandinavian mutual fund company founded in 1993 in Stavanger, Norway, which offers actively managed equity funds. In 2017, SKAGEN became part of Storebrand Asset Management but the company remains an independent fund management business with its own Board of Directors.

History 
SKAGEN Funds was launched in December 1993 by Kristoffer Stensrud, Tor Dagfinn Veen and Åge K. Westbø. The name Skagen came from the name of the street where the company is still headquartered today. Starting in 1997, the company expanded in Sweden and Denmark. SKAGEN Funds was approved to operate in Luxembourg in 2005, in the Netherlands and Finland in 2006, in Iceland and Great Britain in 2007, in Switzerland in 2011, in Belgium in 2013, in Ireland and Germany in 2014, in France in 2016.

Bloomberg reported on January 29, 2014, that Skagen's emerging market fund, SKAGEN Kon-Tiki, had assets under management of 50 billion krone ($8 billion) with an annualized return of 14 percent over the previous 10 years, the eighth-best performer among 1120 similar funds tracked by Bloomberg. The company’s other funds are SKAGEN Global, SKAGEN Vekst, SKAGEN M2 and SKAGEN Focus.

In October 2017, SKAGEN Funds was acquired by Storebrand.

Operations 
The company's head office is located in Stavanger and it also has Norwegian branch offices in Oslo, Trondheim, Ålesund and Bergen, as well as international offices in Denmark, England, Sweden and Germany.

The firm's portfolio managers base their investment decisions on their own research, rather than corporate relationships or internal analyst teams.

See also 

 Storebrand

References

External links

Financial services companies of Norway
Investment management companies of Norway
Financial services companies established in 1993
1993 establishments in Norway